Gurramkonda is a village in Annamayya district of the Indian state of Andhra Pradesh. It is the Mandal headquarters of Gurramkonda Mandal. Gurramkonda Fort is one of the oldest fort in the district. Gurramkonda (village) is a village in the Gurramkonda Mandal of the state of Andhra Pradesh, Annamayya district. It is located at a distance of 0 km from the center of the zones, Horamkonda. It is 35 km from the nearest town, Madanapalle. Is also in the distance. As per the 2011 census of India, the village is spread over 3111 hectares with 2501 houses and a population of 10642. The number of males in the village is 5480, the number of females is 5162. The Scheduled Castes population is 511 and the Scheduled Tribes population is 126. The census location code of the village is 595648. [1]. 13.7833 ° N 78.5833 ° E. on the road to Kadapa, Kadapa, Bangalore [2] The sea can reach 647 meters (2125 feet). The town is a tourist hotspot. It is also historically known as Jaffarabad. Located on Kadapa-Bengaluru Road, this horse-hill is a popular tourist attraction with its historical background. It is a communal harmony with the Hindu and Muslim cultures of the day.

History
There is a strong fort on the hill. It was built by Nawab Abdul Nabi Khan of Kadapa in 1714 CE. Even today, it is worthy of visit and mentioning. Nawab of Kadapa has proved to be quite popular. It is worth mentioning Nawab Abdul Nabi Khan as the governor of Bijapur Sultanate. His period starts from the year 1714 CE Horse-hill. The fort was built by the Sultans of Golconda. The overall style of architecture is Mohammedan style. The fort is perched atop a magnificent hill 500 feet high. The hill is nearly vertical on all three sides and is almost impossible to climb. The fourth side is also steep and miserable. Over forty in the castle There were mosques. But they are dilapidated.chisti kaghazi Hazrat Shah Kamal, kabul shahi kingdom. a Sufi descendant from Persia, settled here and taught Islam to the natives and spread Islam to the surrounding villages. The fort was owned by Tipu Sultan for some years in the late 18th century. Tipu Sultan also erected a coinage to seal the coins. And then Kadapa Then came the rule of the Kadapa Nawabs. The Hazarda Fort is very famous. The 'Rangin Mahal' of the fort attracts visitors. In the period of tipu sultan gurrumkonda ruled by Mir raza ali khan after his son kumaud-din ruled nearly 1782 A.D after a short rule of his son  Mir Bahadhur Madar Khan Gurrumkonda will be goes under East India company.

Hyder Ali appointed teachers to give Tipu sultan an early education in subjects like Urdu, Persian, Arabic, Kannada, Quran, Islamic jurisprudence, riding, shooting and fencing. Gurramkonda born Mir Noor Khan ruled the Kasim Mahal (sanatorium) which is near to the Madanpalle, he worked at Tipu Sultan as chief commander to the military.

Untold History of Gurramkonda 
A unique period to Gurramkonda is 1789-1799 which is under Tipu Sultan it says Gurramkonda has great history Tipu Sultan died in 1799 in Fourth Anglo Mysore war it is the truth. But something interesting according to following information below:

The Islamic calendar (Lunar calendar) 2018 - 2019 is based on the moon. Also known as the Hijri Calendar 1440 - 1441, it started after the Hijrah of Muhammad to Madina. The beginning of each month is contingent on the visibility of the moon at the end of the previous month. Once the moon is sighted, the new month commences. Each month starts with a new lunar cycle. Hence, the Muslim Calendar gives only a tentative overview of the upcoming Islamic dates as the start of each month is subject to the sighting of the moon. Now we are in Islamic year of 1441 (2019) In our research tipu sultan not died in 1799 he died nearly at 1820s  we have the proof to prove it a document written by Tipu Sultan. Given below seal of Tipu Sultan it shows the year and signature of Tipu Sultan

in the year of 1223 an order passed to Mir shah wajid Ali gudu khan  Now we want to add 585 years to Islamic year  then we got 1808 Gregorian year. Till 1820 Tipu Sultan will be alive.

Family of Gurrumkonda nawabs

Palace Features 
Visitors first ... the first fort wall and the trench after it. The elephant's pond (Haati Talab) on the east side of the fort is filled with water from this trench to protect the fort from invasion by enemy forces. Crossing the trench is a second flowing wall, inside which is a fortress. The fort is built around the highest hill (horse hill). There is only one way to go up the hill. The other three sides have natural arrangements that make it impossible for communion to occur. Except for the north side Since the other three sides are hilly monolithic, no one can climb the hill from these three sides. To the north of the hill, there is a spacious stone staircase. The cone seen on the main entrance, built of stone, is 25 feet high It is known that the Hindu kings were the first to build this fort over the symbolism of Vishnu. The Rangini Mahal (Rangi Mahal), the residence of the Nawab at the bottom of the hill, is very impressive. The Rangini Mahal faces from both sides of the facade and surprises the visitors. On the top floor there is a spacious hall, two decorative rooms and six bathrooms. This is a testament to the architectural acumen of the time. But today in front of the Rangini Mahal Many of the large buildings are in complete ruins. While the adjacent kitchen ceiling collapses and the walls are painted, the portico built for the horse buggy used by the Nawab is still firmly in place.

See also
 Gurramkonda Fort

Transport 
The National Highway 340 passes through the village, which connects Rayachoti and Kurabalakunta road of Andhra Pradesh.

References

Villages in Annamayya district
Archaeological sites in Andhra Pradesh
Mandal headquarters in Annamayya district